The Baseball 2003: Battle Ballpark Sengen Perfect Play Pro Yakyuu is a baseball video game released only in Japan in 2003. The game features real time commentaries and bench reports, and the players have been animated using motion capture technology. It includes 12 teams and 528 real life players.

Japan-exclusive video games
2003 video games
Baseball video games
GameCube games
PlayStation 2 games
Konami games
Multiplayer and single-player video games
Video games developed in Japan